Maria Ofelia Erenia Nieto Iglesias (stage name, Ofelia Nieto; Algete, March 18, 1898 - Madrid, 22 May 1931) was a Spanish opera and zarzuela singer. She was the daughter of José Nieto Méndez, a notary of Burgos, and Erundina. She was a sister of Ángeles Ottein and José Nieto, who were also opera and zarzuela singers. Nieto was 14 when she debuted in Amadeu Vives i Roig's Maruxa in the title role. After marriage, she retired in 1928.

References

Bibliography

Further reading
 Santiago, Antón de. 1994. Ofelia Nieto, una gallega en el Olimpo del "bel canto". La Coruña: Biblioteca Gallega.

External links 
 Actas de Nacimiento y Bautismo de Ofelia Nieto y Ángeles Ottein

1931 deaths
1898 births
Spanish sopranos
People from Madrid
20th-century Spanish women opera singers